Rimacola elliptica, commonly known as the green rock orchid or green beaks, is the only species of plant in the orchid genus Rimacola and is endemic to New South Wales. It is an evergreen species which grows in clumps in sandstone cracks and has bright green leaves and in late spring, produces arching flower stems with up to eighteen dull greenish flowers with reddish or brown markings. It only grows near Sydney, mainly in the Blue Mountains and near Fitzroy Falls.

Description
Rimacola elliptica is an evergreen perennial herb with a short, branched, erect stem but which lacks a tuber. Flowering occurs in November and December.

Taxonomy and naming
The green rock orchid was first formally described in 1810 by Robert Brown who gave it the name Lyperanthus ellipticus and published the description in Prodromus Florae Novae Hollandiae et Insulae Van Diemen. In 1942 Herman Rupp changed the name to Rimacola elliptica. The genus name (Rimacola), given by Rupp, is derived from the Latin word rima meaning "cleft" or "fissure" and -cola meaning "dweller". The specific epithet (ellipticus) is derived from the Latin word ellipsis meaning "elliptical".

Distribution and habitat
Rimacola elliptica is mainly found in the Blue Mountains by also occurs disjunctly near Fitzroy Falls and near the coast north of Sydney. It mainly grows in sandstone fissures and on damp sandstone cliffs, often with mosses and other small plants.

See also
 List of Orchidaceae genera

References

External links

Flora of New South Wales
Endemic orchids of Australia
Monotypic Orchidoideae genera
Diurideae genera
Megastylidinae
Plants described in 1842
Taxa named by Robert Brown (botanist, born 1773)